During the 1919–20 English football season, Brentford competed in the Southern League First Division. In the first season of competitive football since the end of the First World War in November 1918, Brentford consolidated with a mid-table finish. It was the club's final Southern League season, as 21 of the 22 First Division clubs were voted into the new Football League Third Division in May 1920.

Season summary 

Despite talk that Brentford would seek election to the Football League after the wartime London Combination title success of the previous season, the directors of the club decided to remain in the Southern League Second Division. As it was, by virtue of the Southern League First Division being expanded to 22 clubs and the departures of West Ham United and Croydon Common (voted into the Football League and resigned respectively), Brentford, Merthyr Town, Swansea Town and Newport County were all elevated from the Second Division to the First Division.

Four years of war meant that secretary-manager Fred Halliday needed to rebuild and expand his squad, with prolific forwards Henry White and guest Jack Cock having left the club, in addition to full backs Jack Peart, Dusty Rhodes and half back Bill Stanton. The only survivors of Brentford's final pre-war squad who made appearance during the 1919–20 season were goalkeeper Ted Price, half back Tom McGovern and outside left Patsy Hendren.

New centre forward Reginald Boyne's six goals in the opening six matches ensured Brentford started the season well, but once his goals dried up, due to a niggling knee injury, the team was robbed of potency in attack. A 10-match winless streak ended when the team went on a five-match unbeaten run through November and December 1919. While manager Fred Halliday was able to field a more or less a settled XI, numerous players were tried in the centre forward position before the arrival of Bert Spreadbury in February 1920. Despite scoring four goals in his first five appearances, Spreadbury failed to help the team gain any consistency and Brentford finished the season in 15th position.

League table

Results 
 Brentford's goal tally listed first.

Legend

Southern League First Division

FA Cup 

 Source: 100 Years of Brentford

Playing squad 
 Players' ages are as of the opening day of the 1919–20 season.

 Sources: 100 Years of Brentford, Timeless Bees, Football League Players' Records 1888 to 1939

Coaching staff

Statistics

Appearances and goals 

 Players listed in italics left the club mid-season.
 Source: 100 Years of Brentford

Goalscorers 

 Players listed in italics left the club mid-season.
 Source: 100 Years of Brentford

Victory international caps

Management

Summary

Transfers and loans

References 

Brentford F.C. seasons
Brentford